The Ljubljana Botanical Garden, officially the University of Ljubljana Botanical Garden, is the central Slovenian  botanical garden, the oldest botanical garden in Southeastern Europe, and one of the oldest cultural, scientific, and educational organisations in Slovenia. Its headquarters are located in the Rudnik District of Ljubljana, the Slovenian capital, at Ig Street along the Gruber Canal to the southeast of Castle Hill. The garden started operating under the leadership of Franc Hladnik in 1810, when Ljubljana was the capital of the Illyrian Provinces. It is thus an averagely old European botanical garden. The institution is a member of the international network Botanic Gardens Conservation International and cooperates with more than 270 botanical gardens all across the world.

References

External links 
 
 

Botanical gardens in Slovenia
Botanical Gardens
1810 establishments in the Illyrian Provinces
Botanical Garden
Monuments of designed nature of Slovenia
Protected areas in Ljubljana
Rudnik District
Cultural monuments of Slovenia